Dry Lips Oughta Move to Kapuskasing is a play by Canadian writer Tomson Highway (Cree), which premiered in 1989 at Theatre Passe-Muraille in Toronto.

Character List
Nanabush (playing the spirit of Gazelle Nataways, Patsy Pegahmagahbow, and Black Lady Halked): A mythical and spiritual creature that possesses the female characters. 
Zachary Jeremiah Keeschigeesik: He is the main character and is having a nightmare that Nanabush put on him. He fears coming home to his wife after losing his underwear at a party but ends up waking up from the nightmare next to his wife and child. 
Hera Keechigeesik: Zachary's wife 
Big Joey: Is a warrior for the rez. He denies being the father to Dickie Bird Halked. His violence is supposed to be against the oppressive white systems but instead his violence is more against the other Natives of the rez.
Dickie Bird Halked: He was born in a bar and suffers from fetal alcohol syndrome; he is unable to talk. He intimidates people and kills Patsy's baby, ending all hope for the future. 
Pierre St. Pierre: The Rez bootlegger
Spooky Lacroix: He has an obsession with Christianity and an addiction to alcohol. Uses his religion for intimidation and a crucifix as a weapon for sexual violence against Patsy. 
Simon Starblanket: He is struggling with self-realization because he lost his belief in spirituality and tradition. His girlfriend is pregnant. He intends to go to South Dakota because of the Native suppression.

Plot summary
Set in the fictional Wasaychigan Hill reserve in Northern Ontario, Dry Lips is a companion piece to Highway's earlier play The Rez Sisters. The Rez Sisters focused on seven women from the community; Dry Lips, whose original working title was The Rez Brothers, is about seven men. It is written in a mix of English, Cree, and Ojibway. It tells the story of life on the Wasaychigan Hill Indian Reserve and the men on the reserve as well. 

The men talk about their plans; Big Joey wants to get a radio show, Zachary wants to open a bakery while Pierre St. Pierre got a new job as a referee for the women's hockey games. Nanabush is a trickster; she can change shape and gender, enact the men's phobias and fantasies about women and also shows the misogynistic attitudes of the men in the play. Each character has their own story within the bigger picture.

The play's original cast included Gary Farmer, Billy Merasty and Graham Greene. Highway's brother René and musician Carlos del Junco were also involved in the production.

In 2010, Highway also staged Paasteewitoon Kaapooskaysing Tageespichit, a Cree language version of the play.

Awards
 Dora Mavor Moore Awards, 1989
Outstanding New Play (Thomson Highway)
Outstanding Production (Theatre Passe Muraille and Native Earth Performing Arts Inc.)
Outstanding Performance by a Male in a Leading Role (Graham Greene)
Outstanding Performance by a Female in a Featured Role (Doris Linklater)
 Floyd S. Chalmers Canadian Play Award, 1989
 Governor General's Literary Award (shortlisted in English Drama)

Bibliography 
 Djubal, Clay."Strategies of Subversion: An Examination of Tomson Highway's The Rez Sisters and its Appropriation of Sonata Form" The University of Queensland, 1998. Includes an analysis of Dry Lips. (Retrieved 31 January 2014).

External links
 Dry Lips Oughta Move to Kapuskasing at playwrights.ca
Script for Dry Lips Oughta Move to Kapuskasing at playwrights.ca

References 

Plays by Tomson Highway
1989 plays
Northern Ontario in fiction
Plays set in Canada
Dora Mavor Moore Award-winning plays